The 33rd Scripps National Spelling Bee was held at the Mayflower Hotel in Washington, District of Columbia on June 8–9, 1960, by the E.W. Scripps Company.

The winner was Henry Feldman (age 13) of Oak Ridge, Tennessee and sponsored by the Knoxville News Sentinel, correctly spelling the word "eudaemonic". It was Feldman's third time in the competition; he had placed 20th the prior year. Second place went to Betty Jean Altschul of Norfolk, Virginia, who had misspelled "velleity". Altschul was also the shortest competitor, at 4 foot 6 inches, and stood on a dictionary in the final round to use the microphone.

The competition had 73 entrants, 48 girls and 25 boys. Twenty-four (16 girls and 8 boys) advanced past the first day of spelling into the finals. Benson Alleman, an English professor from Kentucky, was the pronouncer, for the 13th and final time, as he died before the next year's competition.

References

Scripps National Spelling Bee competitions
1960 in Washington, D.C.
1960 in education
June 1960 events in the United States